Beau Alexandrè Dozier (born November 26, 1979) is an American songwriter, record producer, multi-instrumentalist and television producer. He has worked with chart-topping artists of all genres including Tupac Shakur, Snoop Dogg, Priscilla Ahn, Boyz II Men, The Backstreet Boys, Sir Cliff Richard, and Jennifer Lopez. Dozier is best known for his work developing new Pop and R&B talent which led to his role as a producer on American Idol.

Life and career

Early life
He was born in Los Angeles, California, and was introduced to music at a very young age. His father, Lamont Dozier, who is best known as a member of the Motown songwriting and production team, Holland–Dozier–Holland and mother, film executive Barbara Ullman, encouraged Dozier to follow his passion for music at a very young age. At the age of four Dozier started playing the drums and composing music on the piano.

Early career
At the age of seven Dozier co-wrote and composed the song “I Cry for You” for Ben E. King which appeared on the album Save the Last Dance for Me and on Lamont Dozier’s album Going Back to My Roots (The Anthology). In 1993 at the age of thirteen Dozier, also known as Lil’ Beau in the hip-hop and DJ world, was signed by Irving Azoff to a record deal with Giant Records. During his time on Giant Records he was featured as an artist and producer on records with west coast rappers Snoop Dogg, Xzibit, Kurupt, Daz Dillinger, Ice-T, King T and Tha Alkaholiks. Dozier was featured on Bad Azz’s records “Tha Last Time” and “Too Many Choices”. He was also featured as an artist on C-Style Presents 19th Street LBC Compilation on a song he produced called “Paper Chase” as well as producing The 19 Street Records' “Straight Outta Cali" compilation  which featured Snoop Dogg, Kurupt, Daz Dillinger, Nate Dogg, Jayo Felony, Tha Dogg Pound, MC Eiht, Crooked I, Bad Azz, Tray Deee, and the group The Dove Shack.

Producing and artist development
In 1999, Dozier established Beautown Entertainment and began developing artists in the pop music and R&B genres. He has written and produced records for artists including Christina Milian, The Backstreet Boys, B2K, Boyz To Men, Blaque, Tynisha Keli, Nivea, 3LW, Tiffany Evans, PYT, JC Chasez, Samantha Jade, and Nikki Flores.

Dozier composed and produced the single “Anything” for pop music artist JoJo and “Lie About Us” for Nicole Scherzinger of The Pussycat Dolls. Dozier also wrote and produced the number one single “Kryptonite” for Australian Idol winner Guy Sebastian. He wrote Joss Stone’s single “Spoiled” and also produced two Gap Commercials featuring a cover of “Night Time is the Right Time”, and an orchestra rendition of The Beach Boys’ “God Only Knows”. He also produced the theme song for The Fantastic Four written by Pink.

Dozier also collaborated with Ron Fair on his act Prima J and produced the Much Music Award-winning single for Girlicious. Beau Co-wrote “Why Ask Why” for Vanessa Hudgens with Dr. Luke. Dozier also produced and co-wrote “Yesterday” for the Pussycat Dolls’ Ashley Roberts. Dozier collaborated with the Nick Ashford and Valerie Simpson on songs for British Pop singer Sir Cliff Richards’ album Soulicious. Dozier also produced the Disney Music Award-winning song, “Me and My Girls”, by Fifth Harmony. He also produced a song for recording artist Nelly, called “I Wish I Didn’t Know”.

In 2011 American Idol hired Dozier to develop pop music artists for the show as Consulting Producer and currently holds this position. He also taught a class at USC on music, creativity and technology.
	
He continues to work with chart topping artists and producers like Beyoncé, Jennifer Lopez, Jhené Aiko, Bonnie McKee, Dr. Luke, Nasri Atweh, Julian Bunetta, Fifth Harmony, Phillip Phillips and Jessica Sanchez.

Discography

Songwriter/producer
Boyz II Men
 "Lovin' You"
Nivea - Love Don't Cost a Thing Soundtrack
 "Exgirlfriend"
Jhene Aiko
 "Deja Vu" 
B2K
 "Your Girl Chose Me"
Samantha Jade
 "I'm in Hate with You"
 "End of the World"
Backstreet Boys
 "Love Is"
Jonathan McDaniel
 "It's All About J"
 "Lil' J Took My Girl"
Jonathan McDaniel - Pootie Tang Soundtrack
 "You Know What?"
Tynisha Keli
 "Conversations with God"
 "Even If It Takes Forever"
 "Work It Out"
 "Rose in the Ghetto"
 "Hey DJ"
 "Downtown"
 "Mr. New Guy"
Nikki Flores
 "Get You Out of My Heart"
Bad Azz - Word on tha Streets
Bad Azz - Personal Business
 "Too Many Choices"
3LW
 "Leave Wit You (I Think I Wanna)"
 "Crazy"
 "Be Like That"
 "More Than Friends
 "Uh Oh"
 "Xmas in tha Hood"
 "Naughty on Xmas"
 "Ahh Hell Nah"
 "Do You Ever"
 "That's What's Up"
C-Style Presents 19th Street LBC Compilation
 "Paper Chase"
PYT 
 "Same Ol' Same Ol'"
Ben E. King - Save the Last Dance for Me
 "I Cry for You"
Fifth Harmony - Better Together
 "Me and My Girls"
Joss Stone - Fantastic Four Soundtrack
 "What Ever Happened to the Heroes" (end titles track)
Joss Stone - "Mind Body and Soul"
 "Spoiled"
Joss Stone
 “God Only Knows"
Joss Stone
 "The Night Time Is the Right Time"
Joss Stone
 "Under Pressure" - Queen tribute
Guy Sebastian - So Fresh: The Hits of Autumn 2005
 "Kryptonite"
BoA - "My Name"
 "Feel Me"
Avant featuring Nicole Scherzinger (The Pussycat Dolls)
 "Lie About Us"
Phillip Phillips - American Idol Season 11: Highlights
JoJo - "The High Road"
 "Do Whatcha Gotta Do"
 "Anything"
JoJo – Can't Take That Away from Me
 "When Does It Go Away"
Girlicious – Girlicious
 "Stupid Sh@!"
Girlicious – Rebuilt
 "Face the Light"
 "Grinding"
 "Wake Up"
Cliff Richard - Soulicious
 "Go On and Tell Him"
 "Do You Ever"
 "Every Piece of My Broken Heart"
 "How We Get Down"
 "Saving a Life"
Vanessa Hudgens – Identified
 "Don't Ask Why"
Prima J – Prima J
 "Go Hard"
 "Flip the Script"
Keke Palmer
 "Stuck On You"
Tiffany Evans
 "Who I Am"
 "Can't Walk Away"
 "Favorite Broken Heart"
Hush
 "Real T.V."
Sarai Howard
 "Swear"
Vi3 w/ Da Brat
 "Turn It Up"
Rama Duke
 "I'd Have to Lie"
 "Always Let You Down"
 "Wish I Never Let You"

References 

1979 births
People from Los Angeles
Living people
American male musicians
American male songwriters
Songwriters from California
Record producers from Los Angeles